Kropfenstein Castle is a type of castle known as a cave castle in the municipality of Waltensburg/Vuorz of the Canton of Graubünden in Switzerland.  It is a Swiss heritage site of national significance.

History

There are no surviving records indicating when or how this castle was built.  From the style of construction it appears to have been built in the 13th century and was in operation until the 15th century.  By the 14th century the Counts of Kropfenstein begin to appear in historical records.  They appear to have adopted the castle's name when they took up residence there.  In addition to the area around the castle, the Counts had close relations with the Herrschaft of Rhäzüns.  The Kropfenstein line died out in the 15th century and the castle began to fall into disrepair.

Castle site
The castle is reached through a path that was cut into the rock on the east side.  Eventually a parapet was built along the path to prevent falls.

The castle walls follow the edge of the cliff making its shape very irregular. Due to the overhanging rock wall, the castle remains in generally good condition with limited weathering. The castle was three stories tall with embrasures that are still visible on the upper two stories. The exact floor plan of the castle is unknown but it was probably divided into several rooms. Nothing is known about the castle roof, but it may have been just a canopy to keep rain out.

See also
 List of castles in Switzerland

References

Cultural property of national significance in Graubünden
Castles in Graubünden
Cave castles in Switzerland
Cave castles